Schuur Fire is a 2005 album by Diane Schuur, accompanied by the Caribbean Jazz Project.

Track listing
 "Lover, Come Back to Me" (Oscar Hammerstein II, Sigmund Romberg) – 4:50
 "Don't Let Me Be Lonely Tonight" (James Taylor) – 4:05
 "So in Love" (Cole Porter) – 6:29
 "Look Around" (Alan Bergman, Marilyn Bergman, Sérgio Mendes) – 3:40
 "I Can't Stop Loving You" (Don Gibson) – 3:32
 "As" (Stevie Wonder) – 4:26
 "More Than You Know" (Edward Eliscu, Billy Rose, Vincent Youmans) – 4:10
 "Ordinary World" (Nicholas Bates, Warren Cuccurullo, Simon LeBon, John Taylor) – 4:13
 "Poinciana" (Buddy Bernier, Nat Simon) – 4:14
 "Close Enough for Love" (Johnny Mandel, Paul Williams) – 3:54
 "Confession" (Ivan Lins, Brenda Russell) – 4:21
 "Yellow Days" (Alan Bernstein, Álvaro Carrillo) – 4:03

Personnel

Performance
 Diane Schuur - vocals
 The Caribbean Jazz Project:
 Dave Samuels - arranger, marimba, vibraphone
 Oscar Stagnaro - double bass
 Mark Walker - drums
 Oscar Castro-Neves - guitar, arranger, producer, mixing
 Robert Quintero - percussion, conga
 Dario Eskenazi - piano
 Diego Urcola - trumpet, flugelhorn

Production
 Abbey Anna - art direction
 Charles Paakkari - assistant engineer
 Yutaka 	Engineer - editing, mixing
 Geoff Gillette - engineer, mixing
 David C. Britz - executive producer
 John Burk
 Hal Gaba
 Peggy Teague - make-up, hair stylist
 Bernie Grundman - mastering
 Danielle Brancazio - package design
 Norman Seeff - photography, cover choto
 Dan Steinberg - photography
 Anna Wyckoff - stylist

References

2005 albums
Diane Schuur albums
Caribbean Jazz Project albums
Concord Records albums